The Tasmanian Greens are a political party in Australia which developed from numerous environmental campaigns in Tasmania, including the flooding of Lake Pedder and the Franklin Dam campaign. They form a part of the Australian Greens.

The party is currently led by Cassy O'Connor in the Parliament of Tasmania, with O'Connor and Rosalie Woodruff as its only two MPs in the House of Assembly. At federal level, two Tasmanian senators – Nick McKim and Peter Whish-Wilson – are members of the Greens.

History
The party's history can be traced back to the formation of the United Tasmania Group (UTG) (the first established 'Green' party in the world), which first ran candidates in the 1972 election. Many people involved in that group went on to form the Tasmanian Greens. Bob Brown stood as an Australian Senate candidate for UTG in 1975.

1980s
In the 1982 state election, Bob Brown stood unsuccessfully as an independent in the Denison electorate. In December of that year, Norm Sanders—a sitting member for the Australian Democrats—stood down from state parliament to contest the Senate in a Federal election. A countback of votes followed and Bob Brown was elected to the vacancy, commencing his term in January 1983. The two had much in common—both having been directors of the Tasmanian Wilderness Society—Norm Sanders being considered to be Australia's first elected "green" member of parliament.

Immediately prior to taking the seat, Bob Brown had spent 19 days in Risdon Prison for obstructing workers at the Franklin River dam site. He took his seat on the day of his release. He was re-elected in the 1986 election along with Gerry Bates in the Franklin electorate.

In the 1989 state election a total of 5 Greens—Christine Milne, Lance Armstrong, Di Hollister, Gerry Bates and Bob Brown—were elected after a community backlash against a proposed paper pulp mill at Wesley Vale near Devonport. At the time of the election they were known simply as The Independents. In December 1991 they changed their name to The Green Independents. They held the balance of power in the government for three years, keeping Michael Field's minority Labor Party government in power after signing an agreement known as the Labor–Green Accord. The February 1992 election saw all five sitting Greens re-elected but with a majority Liberal government in power.

Greens supporter Neville Curtis started the magazine Daily Planet in 1989, which later became the official magazine of the Green Independents.

1990s
During 1990-1991 Brown advocated for a merger of the Green Independents with the Australian Democrats to form the "Green Democrats", as opposed to confederating with other Green Parties and forming the Australian Greens. However, following a change in leadership in the Democrats, this plan could not continue and the Independents aligned themselves towards a unified Green Party.

In August 1992 the Green Independents moved to officially form the Tasmanian Greens.

In 1993 Bob Brown stood down to contest the lower house seat of Denison in the federal election and Peg Putt took his seat on a recount. Christine Milne became leader. In May 1995 Gerry Bates resigned and his seat was taken by Mike Foley.

At the 1996 election, four Greens were returned (Lance Armstrong lost his seat in Bass) and they again held the balance of power, this time with a Liberal government.

After seven years of minority governments, the Labor and Liberal parties passed a bill reducing the number of Lower House seats, thus increasing the quota of votes needed under Tasmania's Hare Clark voting system from 12.5% to 16.67%. In 2011, Labor MP David Llewellyn confirmed to ABC Radio that the two major parties had "conspired" to reduce the number of seats in the House specifically to increase the quota for minor parties such as the Greens: "I could admit now that being part of the government back in 1998 or 1997 in conspiring, suppose that's not the best of words but that's what it was, between the Liberal Party and the Labor Party to reduce the size of Parliament on the basis that it would take more percentage for minor parties to actually win a seat."

The 1998 election returned a majority Labor government, as well as a sole Green member—Peg Putt—who had little chance of exercising any influence, but would offer bills into Parliament knowing they would in all likelihood be voted against by both Liberal and Labor parties.

2000s
The 2002 election saw a major resurgence of their popularity, with the party winning 4 seats, and outpolling the Liberal party in the Hobart based seat of Denison.  The swing was primarily against the Liberal Party, while the Labor party continued in the majority. The statewide 18.2% vote in 2002 was the highest vote recorded for a Green party at a state or national level anywhere in the world.

At the 2004 federal election, former Tasmanian Greens leader Christine Milne and WA's Rachel Siewert joined Bob Brown and NSW's Kerry Nettle in the Senate, doubling the Green representation.

On 23 July 2005 the Greens celebrated 33.3 years of political activity and achievements, with a large party entitled "33-and-a-third – Now we're Long Playing!"

The 2006 election saw a 1.5% swing against the Greens but all four sitting members were returned. In the lead up to this election Tasmanians for a Better Future organised a campaign against minority government suggesting it was a risky outcome for commerce and industry.

Peg Putt resigned from the House of Assembly on 7 July 2008, and was replaced as party leader by Nick McKim. Cassy O'Connor was elected as her replacement in Denison after a recount of votes.

2010s
During the 2010 Tasmanian state election, the Tasmanian Greens secured a swing of 5% for a total of 21.6% of the primary vote, picking up a seat in Braddon and securing the balance of power in parliament, with the Tasmanian Greens members of the Tasmanian House of Assembly being Cassy O'Connor, Nick McKim, Kim Booth, Tim Morris and Paul O'Halloran.

On 16 January 2014, Premier Lara Giddings announced that a power sharing arrangement with the Tasmanian Greens was over.

At the 2014 Tasmanian State elections there was a 7.8% swing away from the Greens with the party losing two of its five seats. The re-elected Greens leader Nick McKim said the swing against the Greens was due to electoral support for the conservatives and the "tarnish" of the Greens association with the previous Labor government. Subsequently, Kim Booth was appointed as party leader, however he resigned as leader and from the Tasmanian Parliament on 20 May 2015. Cassy O'Connor was elected to replace him on 11 June 2015.

In mid 2015, with the resignations of Kim Booth and Nick Mckim and being replaced by Andrea Dawkins and Rosalie Woodruff respectively, the Tasmania Greens is now represented entirely by female representatives.

Electoral results

State

Federal elections

At the 2013 federal election, for the lower house, the Tasmanian Greens secured 8.32% of first preference votes which represented an 8.7% swing away from the Greens.

Structure
There are five Electorate Branches—one representing each state/federal electorate—that are responsible for choosing candidates at all levels of government.

The party has an annual state conference and annual general meeting. The State Executive is responsible for the day-to-day administration of the party.

The Tasmanian Greens, together with other State and Territory parties, form the Australian Greens.

Local government
Unlike other political parties in the state, the Tasmanian Greens officially endorse candidates to run in local government elections. They first stood local government candidates in 1999 with two candidates elected. Following the 2005 elections there were ten elected Greens councillors. This expanded to 13 after the 2007 elections.

Parliamentary leaders
 Dr Bob Brown (1989–1993)
 Christine Milne (1993–1998)
 Peg Putt (1998–2008)
 Nick McKim (2008–2014)
 Kim Booth (2014–2015)
 Cassy O'Connor (2015–present)

Members of Tasmanian Parliament

Current
 Cassy O'Connor, 2008–present
 Rosalie Woodruff, 2015–present

Former
 Bob Brown, 1983–1993 
 Gerry Bates, 1986–1995
 Lance Armstrong, 1989–1996
 Di Hollister, 1989–1998
 Christine Milne, 1989–1998 
 Peg Putt, 1993–2008
 Mike Foley, 1995–1998
 Kim Booth, 2002–2015
 Tim Morris, 2002–2014
 Nick McKim, 2002–2015 
 Paul O'Halloran, 2010–2014
 Andrea Dawkins, 2015–2018

See also

 Australian Greens

Notes

Further reading
 Armstrong, Lance J.E. (1997). Good God, He's Green! A History of Tasmanian Politics 1989–1996. Wahroonga, N.S.W., Pacific Law Press. 
 Lines, William J. (2006) Patriots : defending Australia's natural heritage  St. Lucia, Qld. : University of Queensland Press, 2006.  

Tasmania
Greens
1992 establishments in Australia
Political parties established in 1992